Erich Hallhuber (July 14, 1951 – September 17, 2003) was a Bavarian actor. He was born in Munich and worked in theatre, opera, television and film.

Background
Erich Huber Hallhuber was born in Munich, Germany. His father was an opera singer and actor as well.

Death
Hall died from epileptic seizure in his Munich apartment in 2003.

Works
His works include:
 
 Der Stellvertreter 
 Café Meineid
 Löwengrube
 Kriminaltango

Selected filmography 

1976: Munich (TV Movie) - Franz von Riggauer
1983-1985: Polizeiinspektion 1 (TV Series) - Stefan Keller / Heinz Plötzl, Polizeihauptwachtmeister
1983-1993: Derrick (TV Series) - Viktor Lange / Roland Scholler / Dr. Römer
1983-2003: The Old Fox (TV Series) - Max Brauer / Bertram Zabelsdorf / Martin Bernried / Peter Hubmann / Wolfgang Aust
1985-2000: Tatort (TV Series) - Hans Riedl / Bruno Richert
1987-1988: Captain James Cook (TV Mini Series) - Lt. John Gore
1988: How much of human love needs (TV Movie) - Rolf
1989: Boomerang Boomerang - Seiters
1989: Ein Fall für zwei (TV Series) - Felix Hartwig
1989: Frederick Forsyth Presents: Just Another Secret (TV Movie) - Dieter Oberg
1989: Double Play (TV Movie) - Dr. Konrad Thoss
1990: La belle Anglaise (TV Series) - Struhler
1990-2003: Café Meineid (TV Series) - Richter Heinz Wunder
1991-1992: Lion's Den (TV Series)
1991-1994: Anwalt Abel (TV Series) - Dr. Unselt
1991: Eine erste Liebe
1992: Regina auf den Stufen (TV Series) - Paul Oldenhoff
1993:  (TV Mini Series) - Alex Barnes
1993: Der Millionenerbe (TV Series) - Karl Lüderitz
1993: Happy Holiday (TV Series) - Martin
1993: Die Männer vom K3 (TV Series) - Alfons Moosbacher
1994-1995: Immenhof (TV Series) - Stefan Christiansen
1995: Escape to Paradise (TV Mini Series) - Hanno Hellmann
1997:  - Bankier Rudi Hopf
1997-1998: On the Nockherberg (TV Series) - Bruder Barnabas
1997-2000: Der Bulle von Tölz (TV Series) - Dr. Raimund Vogler / Mann bei Auktion
1998-2001: SOKO 5113 (TV Series) - Ralf von Waldow / Gerd Trautmann
1998-2003: Das Traumschiff (TV Series) - Rüdiger Kluge / Peter Böhmert
1999: The Sternbergs (TV Series) - Fabian Sternberg
2000: Die Verbrechen des Professor Capellari (TV Series) - Wolfgang Kruse
2000: Siska (TV Series) - Lothar Hinze
2001: A love in Majorca (TV Movie) - Paul Blesing
2001:  (TV Movie) - Schumann
2002: Amen. - Von Rutta
2002: Wilsberg (TV Series) - Pfarrer Hollein
2003: In the name of the Lord (TV Movie) - Pater Albert
2004: Heiter bis tödlich: München 7 (TV Series) - Oberamtsrat Rudolf Kalisch

External links 
 
 Obituary (German)

1951 births
2003 deaths
Burials at the Ostfriedhof (Munich)
German male stage actors
German male film actors
German male television actors